Charles Dana Luckey (born 1955) is a retired Lieutenant General in the United States Army, who retired after serving as the  Commanding General of the United States Army Reserve Command (since 2016). He is a graduate of the University of Virginia, the University of Connecticut School of Law and the United States Army War College. In July 2020, Jody J. Daniels was confirmed to succeed Luckey as Chief of Army Reserve.

Military career
Luckey is a 1973 graduate of Phillips Exeter Academy who was commissioned as an Infantry Officer in the Regular Army after graduating as a Distinguished Military Graduate from the University of Virginia in 1977. Luckey began his military career leading Soldiers in both mechanized and Special Forces units until separating from active duty in 1982 to attend law school. Graduating with a Juris Doctor from the University of Connecticut School of Law in 1985, Luckey returned to active duty and served with the 82d Airborne, Ft. Bragg, NC. In 1991, Luckey transferred to the Army Reserve and subsequently commanded units at the battalion, brigade, and group level, culminating with his assignment as the Commanding General of the 78th Division (TS)before returning to Active Duty in 2008.

Luckey was recalled to active duty in 2008 and selected to serve as the Chief, Office of Security Cooperation in Baghdad, Iraq. Prior to his current assignment, Luckey served as the Chief of Staff, North American Aerospace Defense Command and Northern Command and on the Joint Staff as Assistant to the Chairman of the Joint Chiefs of Staff for Reserve Matters.  

Lieutenant General Charles D. Luckey assumed duty as the Chief of Army Reserve and Commanding General, United States Army Reserve Command on 30 June 2016 and relinquished command on 2 July 2020. In July 2020, Jody J. Daniels was confirmed to succeed Luckey as Chief of Army Reserve.

Legal Background
Upon retiring from the military, Luckey returned to Winston-Salem's Blanco Tackabery & Matamoros P.A. where he had practiced as a litigation partner for several decades before his recall to active duty. Luckey, a former Army Judge Advocate, is an experienced trial lawyer who has tried a wide variety of both criminal and civl cases in a number of venues and jurisdictions. He is admitted to practice law in several states and federal judicial districts, as well as the US Court of Appeals for the 4th Circuit, and the Supreme Court of the United States. He is an active member in good standing with the North Carolina State Bar.

Personal

Luckey is the father of three adult children, Elisabeth Hunt Luckey, Charles Whittaker Luckey and Timothy Fitch Luckey and is married to the former Julie Marie Fisher of Greensboro, North Carolina. He remains aggressively engaged in a wide variety of activities and operations.

References

1955 births
United States Army personnel of the Gulf War
United States Army personnel of the Iraq War
Living people
Recipients of the Defense Superior Service Medal
Recipients of the Legion of Merit
United States Army generals
United States Army reservists
United States Army War College alumni
University of Virginia alumni
Phillips Exeter Academy alumni